One For Rose (foaled 1999 in Ontario) is a Canadian three-time Champion Thoroughbred racehorse. On October 4, 2002, with little success in racing at nearly four years of age, One For Rose was claimed for $40,000 by trainer Sid Attard for Lou and Carlo Tucci's racing stable. Under trainer Attard, the filly blossomed in 2003 and earned the first of her three consecutive Sovereign Awards as the Canadian Champion Older Female Horse. She was retired at the end of the 2005 racing season after having won her third straight running of the Algoma Stakes, her second straight Ontario Matron Handicap and having beaten her male counterparts in her second straight victory in the Seagram Cup Stakes.

Sent to the January 2006 Keeneland Sales, One For Rose was sold as a broodmare prospect to Isami Nakamura of Japan for US$875,000.

References
 One For Rose's pedigree and partial racing stats
 July 30, 2005 Bloodhorse.com article titled One for Rose Bests Males Again in Seagram Cup
 March 2006 article in the International Horse Racing Digest on the Keeneland sale of One For Rose

1999 racehorse births
Racehorses bred in Ontario
Racehorses trained in Canada
Sovereign Award winners
Thoroughbred family 12-d